The Israeli Premier League is an Israeli league for professional football clubs. It is the country's leading football competition and forms the highest level of the Israeli football league system. The competition began in the 1999–2000 season, following the decision of the Israeli Football Association to form a new league. As of 2011, twelve Premier League seasons have been completed, although only four clubs have been crowned champions. Maccabi Haifa have won the league seven times, Hapoel Tel Aviv and Beitar Jerusalem two times each, and Maccabi Tel Aviv once. The reigning champions are Maccabi Haifa, who won their seventh Premier League title (twelve top division title) in the 2009–10 season.

History

After several years of discussion over the possibility of a so-called "Super League" being formed by Israeli football's leading clubs, the Israeli Premier League came into existence in 1999 when the top clubs broke away from the 44-year-old Liga Leumit. Hapoel Tel Aviv won the first title in the 1999–2000 season, the first time the club had won the championship of Israeli football for 11 years.

The record for the most points accumulated in a Premier League season belongs to Maccabi Haifa, who accumulated 87 points over 35 games in the 2009–10 season (as 3 points for a win not including the playoff points cut, Hapoel Tel Aviv accumulated 85 points in a regular season). At the other end of the scale, Tzafririm Holon accumulated just 16 points in the 2000–01 season (Hapoel Petah Tikva accumulated 14 points but after receiving 4 points deduction in the 2010–11 season). 
Tzafririm Holon also hold the record for the most goals conceded in a season, having conceded 85 goals in the same season, while Maccabi Haifa hold the record for the fewest goals conceded, with just 16 in the 2009–10 season.

Hapoel Tel Aviv hold the record for the most goals scored in a season, having scored 87 goals in the 2009–10 season, while Ironi Kiryat Shmona, in the 2008–09 season, and Hapoel Ramat Gan, in the 2010–11, are having the record for the fewest goals scored, with just 24.

Seasons

References

 
Israeli Premier League Seasons